The California Coastal Commission (CCC) is a state agency within the California Natural Resources Agency with quasi-judicial control of land and public access along the state's  coastline. Its mission as defined in the California Coastal Act is "to protect, conserve, restore, and enhance the environment of the California coastline".

Protection of coastal resources includes shoreline public access and recreation, lower cost visitor accommodations, terrestrial and marine habitat protection, visual resources, and regulation of agricultural lands, commercial fisheries, and industrial infrastructure. It has been called the single most powerful land-use authority in the United States due to its purview over vast environmental assets and extremely valuable real estate.

Property rights activists and real estate developers say that the CCC has exceeded its mission, violated property rights of citizens, and worsened California's housing shortage by limiting housing supply. Environmentalists, on the other hand, say that the Commission has protected open space, views, habitats, and public coastal access.

Composition

The commission is composed of 12 voting members, 6 chosen from the general public, and 6 appointed elected officials. Being on the commission can carry responsibilities which are highly politicized. The 12 appointed commissioners control zoning, compel property alterations, impose fines, bestow construction approvals or vetoes, and require public thoroughfares on private property.

Separate from the appointed Commissioners are the commission's employed staff, numbering some 164 people during 2021–22.

Jonathan Zasloff, a law professor at the University of California, Los Angeles stated that “The commission is the single most powerful land use authority in the United States given the high values of its jurisdiction and its high environmental assets.” and that, because its members are appointed by the governor and the State Senate and Assembly leaders (which have generally been Democrats), “The commission reflects a constituency that is important to Democrats."

Authority
Development activities are broadly defined by the Coastal Act to include (among others) construction of buildings, divisions of land, and activities that change the intensity of use of land or public access to coastal waters.  Development usually requires a Coastal Development Permit from either the Coastal Commission or the local government if such development would occur within the Coastal Zone.  The Coastal Zone is specifically defined by law as an area that extends from the State's seaward boundary of jurisdiction, and inland for a distance from the Mean High Tide Line of between a couple of hundred feet in urban areas, to up to five miles in rural areas. 

The state authority controls construction along the state's  of shoreline. One of the provisions passed under the 1976 California Coastal Act specifically prohibits State Route 1 from being widened beyond one lane in each direction within rural areas inside the Coastal Zone. The Coastal Commission also had the power to block a proposed southern extension of State Route 241 to Interstate 5 at San Onofre State Beach in San Diego County.

The Coastal Commission has the ability to overrule local elected representatives and has also gained the ability to fine private citizens. The agency has sought enforcement through the courts as it originally did not have the power to issue fines on its own to alleged violators. A bill in the California legislature to grant the commission a broad power to issue fines was defeated in September 2013. However legislation attached to the state budget in the summer of 2014 finally granted the authority to impose fines on violators of public-access which could apply to about a third of the backlog of over 2,000 unresolved enforcement cases. The first notable fines were issued in December 2016 against Malibu property owners Dr. Warren M. Lent and his wife, for $4.2 million, and Simon and Daniel Mani, owners of the Malibu Beach Inn, who settled amicably for $925,000. The difference in severity of the fines were attributed to the "egregious" nature of the Lent case.

Local agency administration
A "local coastal program" is the official name for a zoning plan controlled by the commission but administered by a local agency. The commission can retake granular control of any project if it is appealed. An appeal will take approximately 6–8 months on average to reach a final decision and may take longer to resolve more complicated appeals.

The commission is the primary agency which issues Coastal Development Permits.  However, once a local agency (a County, City, or Port) has a Local Coastal Program (LCP) which has been certified by the commission, that agency takes over the responsibility for issuing Coastal Development Permits.  For areas with Certified LCP's, the Commission does not issue Coastal Development permits (except in certain areas where the Commission retains jurisdiction, i.e. public trust lands), and is instead responsible for reviewing amendments to a local agency's LCP, or reviewing Coastal Development Permits issued by local agencies which have been appealed to the commission.

A Local Coastal Program is composed of a Land Use Plan (LUP) and an Implementation Plan (IP). A Land Use Plan details the Land Uses which are permissible in each part of the local government's area, and specifies the general policies which apply to each land use. The LUP can be a part of a local government's general plan. The Implementation Plan is responsible for implementing the policies contained in the LUP. The IP is generally a part of the city's zoning code.

One example
The Local Coastal Program (LCP) for a run-down gateway to Channel Islands Harbor in Oxnard is designated for visitor-serving commercial uses and harbor-related uses that support recreational boating and fishing. The county owns and manages the harbor and wanted to amend the LCP to allow a mixed-use development with up to 400 apartments as their selected developer said the project was only feasible with the housing. In 2020, the commission refused to override the denial by the city of Oxnard of land-use changes as that is only intended to be used in rare instances when a local government is standing in the way of the development of a public works project that would meet regional public needs.

Managed retreat
The Commission recommended cities implement managed retreat philosophies allowing oceans to naturally erode developments thereby nourishing beaches with reclaimed sand made of disintegrated former properties.

History 

The California Coastal Commission was established in 1972 by voter initiative via Proposition 20. This was partially in response to the controversy surrounding the development of Sea Ranch, a planned coastal community in Sonoma County. Sea Ranch's developer-architect, Al Boeke, envisioned a community that would preserve the area's natural beauty. But the plan for Sea Ranch eventually grew to encompass  of the Sonoma County coastline that would have been reserved for private use. This and other similar coastal projects prompted opponents to form activist groups. Their efforts eventually led to putting Proposition 20 on the ballot.

Proposition 20 gave the Coastal Commission permit authority for four years. The California Coastal Act of 1976 extended the Coastal Commission's authority indefinitely.  Jerry Brown, in his first term as governor, signed the California Coastal Act into law, but two years later, became frustrated with the commission and made headlines by calling them "bureaucratic thugs."  Peter M. Douglas helped write the act in addition to prop 20 and was subsequently employed as the Executive Director of the Coastal Commission for 26 years. In 2011 the Commissioners chose Charles Lester as Douglas's replacement, but then fired him in 2016.

Accounting for 164 percent inflation, the commission's total funding declined 26 percent from $22.1 million in 1980 ($13.5 million in then-current dollars) to 
$16.3 million in 2010. The commission's full-time staff fell from 212 in 1980 to 125 in 2010. The commission's total budget for fiscal year 2019-2020 was $32,086,000 The total compensation of the commission's executive director John L. Ainsworth was $254,000 in 2019, Charles F. Lester's was $177,000 in 2015, and Peter M. Douglas's was $213,000 in 2011. Including the proposed budget for fiscal year 2021–22, the cumulative expenses of the Commission since 2007 exceed $348 million.

U.S. Supreme Court Cases

The Supreme Court of the United States ruled in the 1987 case of Nollan v. California Coastal Commission that a requirement by the agency was a taking in violation of the Fifth and Fourteenth Amendments. The Coastal Commission had required that a lateral public easement along the Nollans' beachfront lot be dedicated to facilitate pedestrian access to public beaches as a condition of approval of a permit to demolish an existing bungalow and replace it with a three-bedroom house. The Coastal Commission had asserted that the public-easement condition was imposed to promote the legitimate state interest of diminishing the "blockage of the view of the ocean" caused by construction of the larger house. The court, in a narrow decision, ruled that an "essential nexus" must exist between the legitimate state interest and the permit condition imposed by government, otherwise the building restriction "is not a valid regulation of land use but an out-and-out plan of extortion."

The commission won its attempt to require a permit for activity on a pharmaceutical limestone quarry owned by Granite Rock Company of Watsonville, California, in the United States Supreme Court case California Coastal Comm'n v. Granite Rock Co. Granite Rock's approved Forest Service permit to excavate pharmaceutical limestone expired by the time the case was decided.

Reactions
Critics of the commission's authority say it has exceeded its mission, violated the constitutional property rights of citizens, and worsened the California housing shortage by limiting housing supply. Advocates such as former member Mary Shallenberger say the commission has protected open space, views, habitats, and coastal access and should be given authority to control housing to a greater extent.

On the commission's ability to practically dictate how coastal land is used, Jeff Jennings, the mayor of Malibu commented: “The commission basically tells us what to do, and we’re expected to do it. And in many cases that extends down to the smallest details imaginable, like what color you paint your houses, what kind of light bulbs you can use in certain places.”

Enforcement 
The agency is tasked with protection of coastal resources, including shoreline public access and recreation, lower cost visitor accommodations, terrestrial and marine habitat protection, visual resources, landform alteration, agricultural lands, commercial fisheries, industrial uses, water quality, offshore oil and gas development, transportation, development design, power plants, ports, and public works.  The commission's responsibilities are described in the California Coastal Act, especially the Chapter 3 policies.
The agency has sought enforcement through the courts as it originally did not have the power to issue fines on its own to alleged violators. A bill in the California legislature to grant the commission a broad power to issue fines was defeated in September 2013. However legislation attached to the state budget in the summer of 2014 finally granted the authority to impose fines on violators of public-access which could apply to about a third of the backlog of over 2,000 unresolved enforcement cases. The first notable fines were issued in December 2016 against Malibu property owners Dr. Warren M. Lent and his wife, for 4.2 million dollars, and Simon and Daniel Mani, owners of the Malibu Beach Inn, who settled amicably for $925,000.  The difference in severity of the fines were attributed to the "egregious" nature of the Lent case.

Affordable overnight coastal accommodations

According to the commission, the California Coastal Act requires that “overnight accommodations in the Coastal Zone are [be] available at a range of price points.” When permitting new hotels, they usually try to require 25% of bookings at expensive hotels be offered at lower rates, or, in the case of a developer who is adding a small boutique style hotel to a beach property, they will be required (in 2021) to pay $150,000 into a fund which will help to provide for lower cost accommodations in the region.

In 2019, the commission fined a hotel builder $15.5 million after it “replaced two of the only low-cost motels in Santa Monica with a luxury boutique hotel, without a permit,” the commission said in a statement. “We as an agency have a mandate to encourage public access on the California coast and that means doing everything we can to ensure people can actually afford to stay there,” said Dayna Bochco, who chairs the commission.

Examples 

In 2018, a high profile case was resolved without litigation: at tech billionaire Sean Parker's 2013 wedding in Big Sur, where extensive staging was installed in an ecologically sensitive area without a proper permit, Parker cooperated with the Commission and created a mobile app named YourCoast to help visitors discover 1500 access points to beaches as well as report violations.  He also paid $2.5 million in penalties even though the property owner was at fault and had illegally closed the area to the public for six years.

The Ritz-Carlton Hotel in Half Moon Bay was ordered to pay $1.6 million in penalties for failing to provide public access to its nearby beaches in 2019. Cars of hotel guests and golfers would be parked in public spaces by the valets or public access was simply denied to those spaces.

In 2020, the commission fined 33 Newport Beach residents a total of $1.7 million because their yards encroached on the beach, and required that the beach be returned to its natural state.

In 2019, during the process of replacing wooden power poles with steel poles to reduce wildfire risk, the Los Angeles Department of Water and Power (LADWP) graded fire roads and created new roads on Environmentally Sensitive Habitat Areas in Topanga State Park which destroyed almost 200 endangered Braunton's milkvetch plants on (10% of those plants in the area).  The city agreed that its utility will pay the commission's fine of $1.9 million and will follow the restoration order requiring LADWP to apply for a coastal development permit to complete the project and to restore  of habitat within the coastal zone and an additional  outside the zone.

Project permits and proposals

In the 1980s, the commission denied the Remmenga family's petition to build a home  from the beach in Hollister Ranch unless the public were allowed access through their property. Alternatively, the Remmengas were given the option to pay the commission $5,000 which was said to help fund public pathways to the beach. The California Courts of Appeal held that "even if an individual project does not create an immediate need for a compensating accessway, one may be required of it if its effect together with the cumulative impact of similar projects would in the future create or increase the need for a system of such compensating accessways."

Jeff Peck and his business partner, Steve Barber, bought a large Half Moon Bay property for $3 million in 1999. Peck intended to build homes where his 17-year-old autistic daughter, Elizabeth, could live independently among friends after he dies. He proposed building  of office space on the property to help fund homes that would also be built to house 50 disabled people. The San Mateo County Board of Supervisors unanimously approved the project in 2011.

In 2012 commissioners agreed with appeals filed against the project, saying the proposal would have too large of an impact on utilities, environment and traffic. Peck then filed a civil lawsuit against the commission and a complaint with the state Department of Fair Employment and Housing claiming that the commission's action discriminated against developmentally disabled people. Supporters of the development said the Coastal Commission had never approved any affordable housing for the disabled in the organization's 40-year history. That accusation was based on a cursory database search and doesn't prove anything, said Charles Lester, commission executive director in 2012. 

In 2008, the commission rejected a proposal for a freeway through San Onofre State Park in San Diego County. The decision was upheld by the U.S. Department of Commerce for this alternate route to congested Interstate 5, Southern California's main north–south artery. In agreeing to end lawsuits brought by the state of California, the California Parks and Recreation Commission, the Native American Heritage Commission and the Save San Onofre Coalition, Orange County tollway officials withdrew their approval in 2016 and agreed in a legal settlement to preserve San Onofre State Beach.

About 60 oceanview homes in Dana Point sit precariously on a landslide-prone bluff. Since 2012 Orange County has submitted two petitions to the commission to replace the boulders below the bluff along the beach into a "revetment" a combination of boulders backed by a barrier of concrete with a path on top. The commission has denied the petitions because of the anticipated loss of beach sand and because the county would shoulder the cost, not the homeowners. The county's responsibility for maintaining the bluff comes from a legal settlement dating to the early days of the development. The county's cost for the new structure was estimated to be $10 million for construction and another $15 million in mitigation fees to be paid to the state.

In 2014, the commission appealed a San Diego project by the United States Navy because of environmental impacts. The Navy had awarded a 99-year lease to a developer to build a multi-use development including a  regional Navy headquarters at no cost to the public to replace buildings that dated to the 1920s. The U.S. Congress had authorized the reuse plan in 1987 and local agencies approved a master plan in the 1990s. Critics of the development argued the Navy building should be built at a more secure site on a local base and that the downtown property should be developed as parkland for a more civic use, while plan supporters said the development will mean more economic development and additional reasons for visitors to go to the waterfront. The commission's legal opposition to the project began under Executive Director Peter M. Douglas.

In 2014, the McCarthy family sought permitting to construct a home on their property in San Luis Obispo County. The commission first denied permission telling the McCarthys to relocate a path that ran through the family's property. When the family offered a route to relocate the path and offered to pay for the work, the commission denied their petition because of impacts which included “lesser views for hikers” and significant impacts to the environment. San Luis Obispo County gave the McCarthys a permit, but the commission vetoed it in 2021.

In 2016, the commission denied a controversial proposal for 895 homes, a hotel, and shops from being built on an Orange County oil field overlooking the Pacific Ocean. The Los Angeles Times said the denial was an expression of frustration with competing staff and developer proposals. The site had been disturbed by nearly 70 years of oil production but was still a crucial ecological refuge for plants and animals.

In 2020, the commission delayed construction of a two-story Newport Beach office building and garage with space for two tenants because neighbors objected to the project's potential effect on traffic, noise, light, and views.

In 2020, the commission required the elimination of basements for planned homes in Monterey because there was no way to be completely certain there were no artifacts on the sites in an archaeologically sensitive area, reversing the Monterey County Board of Supervisors' split approval of the projects.

In 2020 and 2021, Santa Cruz city planners advocated housing projects including 175 apartments to be built downtown adjacent to Santa Cruz's main bus station. The commission opposed the downtown project because of insufficient plan conformity with height and density specifications. Commission district supervisor Ryan Maroney said the mass and scale of a building would impact the "coastal resources" of views, community character and aesthetics.

Other

In 2005, the commission found Dennis Schneider's proposed  home in San Luis Obispo to be inconsistent with the California Coastal Act. Several of the conditions were targeted at preserving the character of the view that a boater would have of the coastline from offshore. While commission Executive Director Peter M. Douglas said “the view of pastoral areas from the sea to the land without human structures intervening is very important," the California 2nd District Court of Appeal ruled in a unanimous 2006 opinion: “We believe that it is unreasonable to assume that the Legislature has ever sought to protect the occasional boater’s views of the coastline at the expense of a coastal landowner."

In 2008, studies showed seabirds on offshore rocks abandoned their nests after Fourth of July fireworks celebrations in Gualala. Commission executive director Peter Douglas said the fireworks organizer, the Gualala Festivals Committee, simply refused to work with the commission. The commission sent a cease and desist order banning the fireworks, and a judge in Ukiah rejected a request to delay the commission's ruling. Douglas explained "Our job under the coastal act is to protect marine resources, and that's what is affected here. We don't get involved in 95 percent of the fireworks displays along the coast because most of them don't have these impacts."

Since 2008, the commission, the California state government, and Vinod Khosla have engaged in litigation over reopening a public pathway through Khosla's property to Martin's Beach. Khosla offered to sell a portion of his property to create a pathway for $30 million.

In 2015, the commission approved a construction project for SeaWorld San Diego to build a bigger tank for their killer whales including the condition that they must not breed captive whales to fill them.

In 2020, a commission investigation found the city of Long Beach guilty of pruning palm trees that contained more than one Heron bird nest. One fledgling bird, which later died, was found on the ground in the vicinity of the arborists' work. Proposed penalties include planting trees, more tree-trimming oversight, and fines.

Promotion

The commission utilized the endorsement of poet Amanda Gorman and other celebrities for the commission's advertising and tax-deductible donation campaign suggesting "donate on your California tax form." The commission's logo was designed by FINE, a digital branding and advertising agency. The whale tail license plate purchasing program is a state-sponsored promotional and revenue-generating tool of the commission. Executive director Peter Douglas said the commission rejected many requests from the Wyland Foundation, founded by the original artist of the whale tail painting, for a share of the profits. Denying the foundation, Douglas said the image was being used under the rubric of an “oral agreement,” and that no formal licensing or any word on paper had been set down giving the state the right to use the design. Ultimately $20,000 was donated to Wyland's foundation in 2005, and the Commission paid two artists $1,000 each to paint new art for the license plate.

References

Further reading

External links

  of the California Coastal Commission
 California Coastal Commission Public Education Program
 California Coastal Commission in the California Code of Regulations

Coastal
Coastal Commission
Environment of California
Government agencies established in 1972
1972 establishments in California